Alexander Yevgeniyevich Golovanov (7 August 1904 – 22 September 1975) was a Soviet pilot. On 3 August 1943, he became a Marshal of Aviation (the youngest person in the history of the USSR to hold that rank) and on 19 August 1944 he was promoted to the rank of Chief marshal of the aviation (the second after Alexander Novikov).

World War II

The division led by him bombed, with his personal participation, enemy military facilities in  Berlin (August to September 1941), Königsberg (1 September 1941), Gdańsk (Danzig), Ploieşti and other cities.

During the Battle of Moscow (October 1941 to January 1942) his "long-range aviation hit powerful blows on artillery positions, tank formations and command posts."

From February 1942 he commanded the Red Army Air Force's long-range bomber force (ADD), which transformed into the 18th Air Army on 6 December 1944. The 18th Air Army's units delivered air strikes against the  Axis' deep rear, supported ground forces during the  East Prussian,  Vienna and  Berlin  operations and fulfilled tasks to help the  Partisans of Yugoslavia.

As commander of the Soviet Long Range Aviation (ADD), Golovanov received orders to  destroy Helsinki in early 1944, in order to force  Finland to accept Soviet-dictated terms of peace. Due to deception and skilled use of radar, Finnish anti-aircraft artillery succeeded in saving the city (February 1944). When Stalin later in 1944 found out that he had been mis-informed of the bombing results, ADD was dissolved (6 December 1944) as a punishment. This failure hampered Golovanov's career.

Honours and awards
Two Orders of Lenin
Three Orders of the Red Banner
Three Orders of Suvorov 1st class
Order of the Red Star
Medal "Partisan of the Patriotic War" 1st class
Medal "For the Defence of Stalingrad"
Medal "For the Defence of Moscow"
Medal "For Courage"
Medal "For the Capture of Königsberg"
Medal "For the Capture of Berlin"
Medal "For the Victory over Germany in the Great Patriotic War 1941–1945"

References

1904 births
1975 deaths
Military personnel from Nizhny Novgorod
People from Nizhegorodsky Uyezd
Communist Party of the Soviet Union members
Second convocation members of the Soviet of the Union
Soviet Air Force marshals
Military Academy of the General Staff of the Armed Forces of the Soviet Union alumni
Soviet military personnel of the Winter War
Soviet military personnel of World War II
Recipients of the Order of Lenin
Recipients of the Order of the Red Banner
Recipients of the Order of Suvorov, 1st class